Campanulinidae is a family of cnidarians belonging to the order Leptomedusae.

Genera

Genera:
 Calycella Hincks in Allman, 1864
 Campanulina van Beneden, 1847
 Egmundella  Stechow, 1921
 Gangiostoma Xu, 1983
 Lafoeina Sars, 1874
 Opercularella Hincks, 1868
 Oplorhiza Allman, 1877
 Plicatotheca Calder & Vervoort, 1986
 Racemoramus Calder, 2012
 Stegella Stechow, 1919
 Tetrapoma Levinsen, 1893
 Tripoma Hirohito, 1995

References

 
Leptothecata
Cnidarian families